Loma Vista Recordings is a record label founded by Tom Whalley, former chairman and CEO of Warner Bros. Records and Executive of A&R at Interscope Records. The label was initially a joint venture with Republic Records and is based in Beverly Hills and Brooklyn.

In July 2014, the label announced it had changed strategic partners and was now part of Concord Music Group.

Loma vista is a Spanish phrase that roughly translates to hill view in English.

In February 2021, the label removed rock musician Marilyn Manson from their catalog distribution on allegations of abuse.

Label roster

Current artists
Action Bronson
Andrew Bird
Common
DJDS
Ghost
Health
Iggy Pop
Korn
Denzel Curry
Local Natives
Manchester Orchestra
Margo Price
Meechy Darko
Militarie Gun
Miloe
Overcoats
The Revivalists
Rhye
Rise Against
Robert Glasper
Sampa the Great
Show Me the Body
Skegss
Soccer Mommy
St. Vincent
Sylvan Esso

Former artists
Alice Glass
Cut Copy
Damian Marley
Injury Reserve
Little Dragon
Marilyn Manson
Soundgarden
Spoon

Awards
In 2013, the label received its first Grammy Nomination for the Django Unchained soundtrack released in December 2012.

In 2014, the label received two Grammy Nominations for St. Vincent's self-titled album (Best Alternative Music Album) and Little Dragon's Nabuma Rubberband  (Best Dance / Electronic Album).

St. Vincent won the Grammy for her self-titled album on February 8, 2015.  She was the first female solo artist to win the Best Alternative Music Album category since Sinéad O'Connor in 1991.

Ghost won a Grammy for Best Metal Performance for their song 'Cirice' in 2016.

Sylvan Esso was nominated for a Best Dance Album Grammy in 2017.

At the 61st Annual Grammy Awards, St. Vincent's Masseduction won the award for Best Recording Package and Best Rock Song for its title track and was also nominated for the Best Alternative Music Album.

References

External links 
 

American record labels
Labels distributed by Universal Music Group
Record labels based in California